John Slater (6 April 1889 – 15 February 1935 ) was an English Conservative Party  politician.

In 1932, Slater was elected as Member of Parliament (MP) for Eastbourne in East Sussex, in an unopposed by-election on 29 March following the death of Conservative MP Edward Marjoribanks.

Slater held the seat for less than three years, dying in office on 15 February 1935, aged 45.  At the  resulting 1935 Eastbourne by-election, the Conservative candidate Charles Taylor was returned unopposed.

References

External links 
 

1889 births
1935 deaths
Conservative Party (UK) MPs for English constituencies
UK MPs 1931–1935